Peace and Love is a public sculpture in Beverly Hills, California. It was designed by Ringo Starr, the former member of The Beatles who resides in Beverly Hills, and it weighs 800 pounds. Mayor John A. Mirisch has suggested the sculpture reflects the values of Beverly Hills: "We want to be a city of love and peace."

References

Buildings and structures in Beverly Hills, California
Peace monuments and memorials
Ringo Starr
Sculptures in California
2019 establishments in California